The Tiburon Railroad & Ferry Depot Museum is located at 1920 Paradise Drive, on the waterfront of Tiburon, California.  It is located in the former San Francisco and North Pacific Railroad Station House/Depot, a Greek Revival building erected in 1886 by the San Francisco and North Pacific Railroad.  Designed to be movable, the building has historically rested in several places, including a wharf, prior to its present location.  The railroad removed its major rail and ferry passenger service to Sausalito about 1920, and usage of this building declined; it was abandoned by the railroad in 1939.  It was donated to the town in 1989, and has since been restored for use as a museum.  It was listed on the National Register of Historic Places in 1995.

See also
National Register of Historic Places listings in Marin County, California

References

External links

Museum web site

National Register of Historic Places in Marin County, California
Greek Revival architecture in California
Museums in Marin County, California
Tiburon, California
Railroad museums in California
Railway stations on the National Register of Historic Places in California